A kame is a geomorphological feature.

Kame or KAME may also refer to:
 Khami, or Kame, an ancient city of Zimbabwe
 KAME project, a cooperative UNIX IPv6 coding effort of six Japanese companies
 KNSN-TV, a television station (channel 20) licensed to Reno, Nevada, United States, which held the call sign KAME-TV from 1981 to 2019
 Kame Sennin (Japanese for "Turtle Hermit") or Master Roshi, a character in Dragon Ball media
 , also known as Kame, a Japanese singer, member of the group KAT-TUN

People with the name 
 Amy Kame (born 1992), American basketball player
 Mario Kame (born 1995), Albanian footballer 
 Kamé Ali (born 1984), Malagasy athlete
 Kame Nakamura (1898–2012), Japanese supercentenarian

See also
 Came (disambiguation)
 Kaim (disambiguation)
 Kame Island, in Antarctica